The Next Me is the debut Mandarin solo EP by Aaron Yan of Taiwanese Mandopop quartet boy band Fahrenheit. It was released by HIM International Music on 25 March 2011 with pre-orders available from 11 March 2011. The Japanese edition was released on 15 June 2011 by Pony Canyon, which included the Japanese version of title track "" (The Next Me).

The EP consists of five songs and one instrumental track performed by Yan. The track "" (I Can See Nothing But You) was composed by label mate singer-songwriter Tank, it also features a duet, "" (Just One Look) with Singaporean songstress Olivia Ong.

The album is the third best selling album in Taiwan in 2011, with 68,000 copies sold.

Track listing

Music videos
 "下一個我" (The Next Me) MV
 "只看見妳" (I Can See Nothing But You) MV
 "最後一眼" (Just One Look) MV

References

External links
  Fahrenheit discography@HIM International Music

2011 EPs
Mandopop EPs
HIM International Music albums
Aaron Yan albums